Szerelemhegyi is a Hungarian-language surname. It is a calque of German "Liebenberger" ("lovely/beautiful mountain" + suffix of affiliation "-er")  Notable people with this surname include:

Ervin Szerelemhegyi (1891–1969), Hungarian Olympic track and field athlete
 (1857–1942), Hungarian historian and educator
 (1762–1826), Hungarian composer and opera writer

References

Hungarian-language surnames